Martha is a town in Jackson County, Oklahoma, United States. The population was 162 at the 2010 census.

Geography
Martha is located at  (34.725571, -99.386397).

Demographics

As of the census of 2000, there were 205 people, 82 households, and 49 families residing in the town. There were 98 housing units at an average density of 390.3 per square mile (151.4/km2). The racial makeup of the town was 72.20% White, 2.44% African American, 6.34% Native American, 12.68% from other races, and 6.34% from two or more races. Hispanic or Latino of any race were 26.34% of the population.

There were 82 households, out of which 35.4% had children under the age of 18 living with them, 50.0% were married couples living together, 4.9% had a female householder with no husband present, and 40.2% were non-families. 37.8% of all households were made up of individuals, and 17.1% had someone living alone who was 65 years of age or older. The average household size was 2.50 and the average family size was 3.47.

In the town, the population was spread out, with 28.8% under the age of 18, 12.2% from 18 to 24, 26.3% from 25 to 44, 21.0% from 45 to 64, and 11.7% who were 65 years of age or older. The median age was 35 years. For every 100 females, there were 122.8 males. For every 100 females age 18 and over, there were 114.7 males.

The median income for a household in the town was $20,000, and the median income for a family was $30,000. Males had a median income of $31,389 versus $13,125 for females. The per capita income for the town was $9,799. About 24.0% of families and 21.3% of the population were below the poverty line, including 16.4% of those under the age of eighteen and 40.9% of those 65 or over.

References

Towns in Jackson County, Oklahoma
Towns in Oklahoma